Bhutia is a Tibetan surname that may refer to
Bhaichung Bhutia (born 1976), Indian football player
Kunzang Bhutia (born 1994), Indian football goalkeeper 
Lako Phuti Bhutia (born 1994), Indian football player
Nadong Bhutia (born 1993), Indian football player
Samten Bhutia, Indian film director and writer 
Sonam Bhutia (born 1994), Indian football midfielder 
Thupden Bhutia (born 1987), Indian football player